Dale Newton (born 10 August 1983) is an English former professional darts player who played in Professional Darts Corporation (PDC) events. He is the brother of fellow darts player Wes Newton. He was nicknamed Artful Dodger.

Career
Newton played in the 2006 PDC World Darts Championship but lost in the last 64 to Kevin Painter of England. Newton participated in the 2007 UK Open, losing to Ricky Williams of England in the last 160.

World Championship performances

PDC
 2006: Last 64 (lost to Kevin Painter 1–3) (sets)

References

External links

1983 births
Living people
English darts players
Professional Darts Corporation associate players
People from Blackpool